The Diocese of Asia was a diocese of the later Roman Empire, incorporating the provinces of western Asia Minor and the islands of the eastern Aegean Sea. The diocese was established after the reforms of Diocletian, was subordinate to the Praetorian prefecture of the East, and was abolished during the reforms of Justinian I in 535.

It was one of the most populous and wealthy dioceses of the Empire, and included 11 provinces: Asia, Hellespontus, Pamphylia, Caria, Lydia, Lycia, Lycaonia, Pisidia, Phrygia Pacatiana, Phrygia Salutaria and Insulae.

List of known Vicarii Asiae 
 Flavius Ablabius (324-326)
 Tertullianus (c. 330)
 Veronicianus (334-335)
 Scylacius (c. 343)
 Anatolius (c. 352)
 Araxius (353-354)
 Germanus (360)
 Italicianus (361)
 Caesarius (362-363)
 Clearchus (363-366)
 Auxonius (366-367)
 Musonius (367-368)

References 

Asia
Asia
Civil dioceses of the Byzantine Empire
Praetorian prefecture of the East
Roman Anatolia
314 establishments
States and territories established in the 310s
535 disestablishments
States and territories disestablished in the 530s